Terrence King may refer to:

 Terrence King, character in Necessary Roughness, see List of Necessary Roughness characters
 Terrence King, character in Person of Interest, see List of Person of Interest characters

See also 

 Terry King (disambiguation)